Jones Beach may refer to:

Australia 
 Jones Beach (New South Wales), located in the Illawarra / South Coast regions of New South Wales

United States 
Jones Beach Island, a barrier island off the coast of Long Island, New York:
Jones Beach State Park, a state park in Nassau County, New York located on Jones Beach Island
Northwell Health at Jones Beach Theater, an outdoor amphitheater located at Jones Beach State Park 
Jones Beach, near Clatskanie, Oregon
Jones Beach, Ontario, a village on the shore of Lake Ontario
Jones Beach Camp in Sinkyone Wilderness State Park, in California

See also
Major Thomas Jones